Premier Manager 98 is a football management simulation game, released for the PC in 1997 and the PlayStation the following year. It was developed by Dinamic Multimedia and published by Gremlin Interactive. It is the firth game in the Premier Manager series.

Gameplay 
Premier Manager 98 is a football management simulation game that puts the player in charge of a team of their choice from the top four English divisions (Premier League to the third division, as it was known at the time) from the 1997–98 season. Players are responsible for team selection, tactics, training, player transfers and limited financial direction (setting the ticket price and allocating funds to various area's of the clubs operations). The game progresses on a week-to-week basis, pausing to allow players to make decisions and to watch matches.

The game offers two different modes, 'Arcade' in which allows players to control a club of their choosing, and 'Simulation' mode, in which players take on a vacant job in the lower leagues and can work their way up to manage a bigger club.

In-game highlights use the same engine as for Gremlin's 1997 release Actua Soccer 2, with Barry Davies again providing commentary as he did in that release.

The game is playable with the PlayStation Mouse accessory.

Development 
Madrid-based Dinamic Multimedia had already worked on several titles in the genre, having developed and published the PC Fútbol series from 1992 and developed the Premier Manager series for Gremlin Interactive since the '97 release.

The developers enlisted the writers at Goal! magazine, fanzine editors and football fans to provide individual statistics for the players in the game's database.

To mark the game's release Gremlin held a press launch with real-life football managers Joe Kinnear, Harry Redknapp and Dave Bassett.

Reception 

The game reportedly sold 44,000 copies in its first week after release, becoming the highest selling video game in the UK in July 1998 and the fourth highest selling of the year overall. It went on to become Gremlin's most successful ever UK boxed release.

Writing in CVG Steve Key awarded the PlayStation release a score of 5/5, describing it as "deeply involving" and setting a "virtually unreachable benchmark for all those that dare to dry and better it". Extreme PlayStation magazine's Saul Trewen was similarly positive, writing that "the graphics aren't great, the sound is only functional, but the gameplay, depth and addictiveness are phenomenal". The game received a score of 7/10 in Official PlayStation Magazine, with reviewer Steve Faragher describing it as a "game that die-hard football management fans are going to find rather lightweight", pointing to its  lack of challenge and "limited tactical options" including the inability to change tactics mid-game.

Arcade magazine were critical of the PC version, commenting that while it had undergone an "accurate database update", the "imperfections that bugged PM's previous incarnation (Premier Manager 97) remain and now stick out further that Jimmy Hill's chin".

References 

1998 video games
Association football management video games
Dinamic Multimedia games
Europe-exclusive video games
Gremlin Interactive games
PlayStation (console) games
Single-player video games
Video games developed in Spain
Windows games
1997 video games